Nanhui New City is a planned city located in the Pudong New Area of Shanghai, China. It was formerly called Lingang New City (临港新城) until it was renamed in April 2012.

Construction began in 2003 and is scheduled to be completed in 2020, with the German architecture company Gerkan, Marg and Partners leading the project. The project is estimated to have cost $4.5 billion. The city is aimed to house 450,000 to 800,000 residents while attracting 10 million annual tourists.

Location
The site is located at the tip of the peninsula between the Yangtze and the Qiantang rivers on Hangzhou Bay. It is approximately 60 kilometers southeast of downtown Shanghai. A major portion of the site was reclaimed from the sea.

The city was slated to become a "mini-Hong Kong". However, despite real estate developments being sold quickly, people have been reluctant to move in. To help vitalize the city, eight university campuses have been built on the west side of Nanhui New City, bringing in more than 100,000 students. In August 2019, it was announced that the area will be included in the Shanghai Free-Trade Zone.

== Attractions ==
 Shanghai Haichang Ocean Park
 Wintastar indoor ski resort
 Shanghai Planetarium
 China Maritime Museum, Shanghai

See also 
Nanhui District

References

External links
 Website of the architecture office
 More information about Nanhui
 Article by Welt Online
 Bauen in China - Shanghai: Lingang New City, S. 50-68 (PDF; 7,45 MB; in German)

Planned cities
Pudong
Towns in Shanghai